Wendy Scott (1948, Wemyss, Scotland – 14 October 1999, London) was considered one of the most notable cases of Münchausen syndrome on record, in part because of the severity of her condition and in part because she is a rare case of complete recovery from the syndrome, which many doctors consider untreatable.

References
"A Great Pretender Now Faces the Truth of Illness", New York Times, 20 July 1999
"Woman who 'cried wolf' dies of cancer", BBC News, 25 October 1999
Dr. Marc Feldman's Munchausen Syndrome, Malingering, Factitious Disorder, & Munchausen by Proxy Page

1948 births
1999 deaths
People with factitious disorders